Maladzyozhnaya is a Minsk Metro station in Minsk, Belarus. It opened on July 3, 1995.

Gallery 

Minsk Metro stations
Railway stations opened in 1995